Mockingjay is a 2010 science fiction novel by American author Suzanne Collins. It is chronologically the last installment of The Hunger Games series, following 2008's The Hunger Games and 2009's Catching Fire. The book continues the story of Katniss Everdeen, who agrees to unify the districts of Panem in a rebellion against the tyrannical Capitol.

The hardcover and audiobook editions of Mockingjay were published by Scholastic on August 24, 2010, six days after the ebook edition went on sale. The book sold 450,000 copies in the first week of release, exceeding the publisher's expectations. It received a generally positive reaction from critics. The book has been adapted into a two-part movie, with the first part released on November 21, 2014, and the second part released on November 20, 2015.

Inspiration and development 
Collins has said that the main inspiration for The Hunger Games series came from the classical account of Theseus and the Minotaur. In Greek mythology, as a punishment for the killing of King Minos's son Androgeos, Athens was forced to sacrifice seven youths and seven maidens to Crete, who were then put in the Labyrinth and killed by the Minotaur. After a while, Theseus, the son of the Athenian king, decided to put an end to the Minotaur and Minos's terror, so he volunteered to join the third group of victims, ultimately killing the Minotaur and leading his companions out of the monster's Labyrinth.

Collins has said that there are also many parallels between the Roman Empire and the fictional nation of Panem. She describes the Hunger Games as "an updated version of the Roman gladiator games, which entails a ruthless government forcing people to fight to the death as popular entertainment." Collins also explains that the name "Panem" came from the Latin phrase "Panem et Circenses", which means "Bread and Circuses" and refers to the strategy used by Roman emperors to appease the masses by providing them with food and entertainment (Juvenal, Satires, 10.81).

As with the previous books in the trilogy, Mockingjay contains 27 chapters, with nine chapters in each of the three parts. This structure, which Collins had previously used in her series The Underland Chronicles, came from Collins's playwriting background. This "three-act" structure is also apparent in the trilogy as a whole; Collins stated that she "knew from the beginning" that she was going to write a trilogy.

The cover and title information was revealed by Scholastic on February 11, 2010. The cover continues the previous books' theme on the symbol of peace. The novel's title comes from the hybrid birds of the same name that feature in the novels' storyline. As Publishers Weekly has stated, "the hybrid birds that are an important symbol—of hope and rebellion—throughout the books". Collins likens Katniss to a Mockingjay because both "should never have existed".

Plot
Following Catching Fire, Katniss Everdeen, her mother, her sister Primrose Everdeen, mentor Haymitch Abernathy, and her friends Finnick Odair and Gale Hawthorne, along with the survivors from District 12, adjust to life underground in District 13, headquarters of the rebellion in Panem. Katniss reluctantly agrees to act as "the Mockingjay”–the symbol of the rebellion–for rebel propaganda, on the condition that District 13's President Alma Coin grants immunity to all surviving Hunger Games tributes, including Katniss's friend Peeta Mellark and Finnick's lover Annie Cresta. Coin, however, insists on flipping a coin for Katniss's other demand: the right to personally execute Panem President Coriolanus Snow. Katniss is sent to a hospital in District 8 to film the destruction that the Capitol has inflicted, and while Haymitch orders her to retreat as soon as a raid begins, she stays behind and fights before giving a speech that is broadcast in all twelve districts. The Capitol tortures Peeta to demoralize Katniss. A rescue team extracts Peeta along with the other captured victors, but discover that he has been brainwashed to fear and despise Katniss. He attempts to kill her, and is restrained under heavy guard while medics seek a cure. Finnick and Annie marry in a propaganda effort.

Katniss and Gale are sent to persuade District 2 to join the rebellion. Gale's controversial strategy results in a decisive victory over District 2, enabling a final assault against the Capitol itself. Katniss is assigned to a squad and sent with a film crew to shoot propaganda in the Capitol. President Coin also sends Peeta, still dangerous and unpredictable; Katniss suspects Coin wants her dead for her lack of support and growing influence. While filming in a supposedly safe Capitol neighborhood, the team's commander Boggs is fatally wounded; before dying, he gives Katniss the team's command. She decides to infiltrate the Capitol and kill Snow, telling her team that this was Coin's secret plan; she later reveals the lie, but the team sticks with her. In the ensuing urban warfare, many of Katniss's comrades, including Finnick, are killed. As the last of her squad reaches Snow's mansion, a hovercraft bearing the Capitol seal drops bombs among a group of children being used as human shields. Rebel medics, including Prim, rush in to help the injured children, and the remaining bombs detonate. Prim is killed, and Katniss sustains severe burns.

As she recuperates, Katniss, deeply depressed over her sister's death, learns the rebels have taken over the Capitol and Snow is to be publicly executed. She confronts Snow, who claims that Coin orchestrated the bombing to turn Snow's remaining supporters against him, reminding Katniss of their promise to never lie to each other and how District 13 benefited from the revolution. Horrified, Katniss realizes Gale had earlier proposed a similar tactic. She becomes convinced that, rather than establish a republic governed by representatives from each District, Coin intends to take Snow's place and maintain the status quo. Coin hosts a referendum for the remaining Victors to decide whether to host another Hunger Games for the Capitol children. Although three, including Peeta, are against the plan, Katniss, Haymitch and two others outvote them.

Set to execute Snow, Katniss instead shoots Coin and immediately attempts suicide, but Peeta stops her, and she is arrested in the ensuing riot. Snow is later found dead, and rebel Commander Paylor of District 8 takes over as president. Katniss is acquitted of murder by reason of insanity and sent home to District 12, while her mother leaves for District 4 and Gale leaves for District 2. Other District 12 natives later return, including Peeta, who has recovered his memories and his love for Katniss. She embraces him, recognizing her need for his hope and strength. Together, they write a book to preserve the memory of those who died. Though still suffering flashbacks and screaming nightmares, they manage to comfort each other.

Twenty years later, Katniss and Peeta are married and have two children. Under Paylor's administration, the Hunger Games are abolished with the arenas replaced by memorials. Katniss is happy with her new life and her family, but still carries mental and emotional scars, and dreads the day her children learn about their parents' involvement in the war and the Games. She tells her young daughter that when she feels distressed, she plays a comforting, repetitive game: reminding herself of every good thing she has ever seen someone do. The series ends with Katniss's reflection that there are much worse games to play.

Themes
Reviews have noted many themes in the previous books that are also explored in Mockingjay. A review from The Baltimore Sun noted that "the themes of the series, including physical hardships, loyalty in extreme circumstances and traversing morally ambiguous terrain, are continued at an even larger scale." In the book, Katniss must deal with betrayal and violence against people. At the same time, while she was symbolically touching thousands of lives, she must also lead those people into war. Finally, Katniss realizes she cannot even trust President Coin, leader of District 13.

In an interview with Collins, it was noted that the series "tackles issues like severe poverty, starvation, oppression, and the effects of war." Collins replied that this inspiration was from her father, who, when going to war in Vietnam, made sure that his children understood the consequences and effects of war. Yvonne Zipp of The Christian Science Monitor noted that it was "the most brutal of the trilogy" and that "Collins doesn't take war lightly – her characters debate the morality involved in tactics used to try to overthrow the rotting, immoral government, and they pay a high cost for those tactics." Katie Roiphe of The New York Times wrote that "it is the perfect teenage story with its exquisitely refined rage against the cruel and arbitrary power of the adult world." In a review for USA Today, Bob Minzesheimer pointed out that the novel contained optimism: "Hope emerges from despair. Even in a dystopian future, there's a better future."

Minzesheimer also noted a central question of "Real or not real?" which was asked throughout the novel by Peeta. Susan Carpenter of the Los Angeles Times also pointed this out, writing, "Mockingjay takes readers into new territories and an even more brutal and confusing world: one where it's unclear what sides the characters are on, one where presumed loyalties are repeatedly stood on their head".

Publication history
Mockingjay was first released in the US and Canada on August 24, 2010. The UK, New Zealand and Australia received the book one day later, on August 25, 2010. The audiobook was released simultaneously on August 24, 2010, by Scholastic Audio.

Sales
The book had a 1.2 million-copy first printing that was bumped up from 750,000. In its first week of release, the book sold over 450,000 copies. Following this, Scholastic printed an additional 400,000 copies, bringing the initial print run up to 1.6 million. Scholastic Trade president Ellie Berger said that sales "have exceeded all expectations". The book has also been released in e-book format and topped sales in the week ending with August 29, 2010, beating out The Girl with the Dragon Tattoo, which had held the top spot since April. The other Hunger Games books have also made it in the top ten, with the first book at fifth and the second book taking eighth. , the book has sold over 9 million copies.

Release

Promotion
To promote the release of Mockingjay, many bookstores held midnight release parties. The official event in New York City was attended by Collins, and included many activities such as a tarot card reader, a magician, jugglers and face-painters. Prizes such as signed copies of Catching Fire and Hunger Games-themed cups were raffled. Once Collins arrived, she read the first chapter of the novel, explaining that she would read with an accent since Katniss, the narrator, is from Appalachia. By midnight, copies were being sold with a signature stamp since Collins had a hand injury and was unable to sign.

Before the release, Scholastic also released a trailer for the book, launched a Facebook page that gained over 22,000 fans in 10 days, and held a contest for booksellers to win a visit from Collins and an online countdown clock to the release date. There were also advertisements for the book on websites such as Entertainment Weekly and Romantic Times. National Entertainment Collectibles Association also sold other goods such as T-shirts, posters, games and bracelets. Collins also held a "13-District Blog Tour" where 13 winners received a free copy of Mockingjay on August 24, 2010. A tour was also scheduled, starting at Books of Wonder in New York where the official party took place. The tour ended on November 6, 2010, in the Third Place Books store in Lake Forest Park, Washington.

Critical reception
Mockingjay has received critical acclaim. According to literary review aggregator Book Marks, the novel received a cumulative "Rave" rating based on 11 reviews. Publishers Weekly gave the book a starred review, calling it "the best yet, a beautifully orchestrated and intelligent novel that succeeds on every level". The review went on to praise the "sharp social commentary and the nifty world building". Nicole Sperling of Entertainment Weekly gave the book a B+ and said, "Collins has kicked the brutal violence up a notch in an edge-of-your-seat plot".  Kirkus Reviews gave Mockingjay a starred review, saying that the novel is exactly what its fans are looking for and that "it will grab them and not let go". Susan Carpenter of the Los Angeles Times compared the battlefield to Iraq and said that the book is every bit as original as the first in the series, ending the review with "Wow".

The Baltimore Sun Nancy Knight commented that the book "ends on an ostensibly happy note, but the heartbreaking effects of war and loss aren't sugar-coated" and that it will have readers thinking about the effects  of war on society. Katie Roiphe of The New York Times said it is "the perfect teenage story with its exquisitely refined rage against the cruel and arbitrary power of the adult world". However, she criticized that it was not as "impeccably plotted" as The Hunger Games. Bob Minzesheimer of USA Today gave the book three out of four stars. The Christian Science Monitor reviewer Yvonne Zipp described it as "an entirely gripping read".

Some critics noted that there was a suspense drop between Catching Fire and the start of Mockingjay. While a review from The Sacramento Bee praised the action scenes and the battle in the Capitol, the reviewer also criticized Collins for not giving enough time to finish all the loose ends, writing that "the disappointment with Mockingjay hits primarily as Collins starts her home stretch. It's almost as if she didn't allocate enough time or chapters to handle all her threads".

Film adaptation

The Hunger Games trilogy was adapted into a series of films, with the stars of the 2012 film The Hunger Games signed on for all four films. Mockingjay was split into two parts; Part 1 was released on November 21, 2014, and Part 2 was released on November 20, 2015.  Francis Lawrence, director of The Hunger Games: Catching Fire, returned to direct the two final films in the series.  Julianne Moore played President Coin.

See also

References

External links

 Suzanne Collins—Official Website
 The Hunger Games trilogy on Scholastic

2010 American novels
2010 science fiction novels
Dystopian novels
American novels adapted into films
American adventure novels
American post-apocalyptic novels
American science fiction novels
American young adult novels
Sequel novels
3
Children's science fiction novels
Classical mythology in popular culture
American war novels
Novels set in North America
Books by Suzanne Collins
Science fiction novels adapted into films
Scholastic Corporation books